"Mandela Day" is a song by the rock band Simple Minds. It was included in the single  "Ballad of the Streets" EP which reached No.1 on the British charts in February 1989  and in their album Street Fighting Years. The single highlights the songs "Mandela Day", "Belfast Child", originally its A-side in the full length version,  and "Biko".

"Mandela Day" was written for the Nelson Mandela 70th Birthday Tribute (also known as Mandela Day), a concert held at Wembley Stadium, London, on 11 June 1988, as an expression of solidarity with the then-imprisoned Nelson Mandela, and was played live on that day (alongside cover versions of "Sun City" with Little Steven and a cover version of Peter Gabriel's "Biko" on which Gabriel himself took on lead vocals).

The official music video for the song was directed by Andy Morahan.

Track listings

7" vinyl
 UK, Germany: Virgin / SMX 3
 France: Virgin / 90496

12" vinyl
 UK: Virgin / SMXT 3
 UK: Virgin / SMX BS (limited edition box set, including 4 black-and-white photographs from the music video)
 France: Virgin / 80432
 Germany: Virgin / 611 998
 Yugoslavia: Jugoton /MXSVIRG 18016

CD
 UK: Virgin / SMXCD3 (3")
 UK: Virgin / SMXCDT3 (5")

References

See also
 Nelson Mandela
 Nelson Mandela 70th Birthday Tribute (also known Mandela Day)

1989 songs
Songs about Nelson Mandela
Songs written by Jim Kerr
Songs written by Charlie Burchill
Songs written by Mick MacNeil
1989 singles
A&M Records singles
Music videos directed by Andy Morahan
Simple Minds songs